HD 173416 b is an extrasolar planet located approximately 440 light years away in the constellation of Lyra, orbiting the 6th magnitude G-type giant star HD 173416. This is planet has at least 2.7 times the mass of Jupiter and was discovered on January 10, 2009 by Liu et al. HD 173416 b orbits at 1.16 AU from the star. However, despite the fact that the planet orbits 16% further from the star than Earth does from the Sun, it has orbital period of only 323.6 days, compared to 365.25 days for Earth. This inverse relationship is caused by the parent star having twice the mass of the Sun, which increases the strength of its gravitational field. This evidence implies that when this star was on the main sequence, it was an A-type star.

The planet HD 173416 b is named Wangshu (望舒). The name was selected in the NameExoWorlds campaign by Nanjing, during the 100th anniversary of the IAU. Wangshu is the goddess who drives for the Moon and also represents the Moon in Chinese mythology.

References

External links 

 

Exoplanets discovered in 2008
Giant planets
Lyra (constellation)
Exoplanets detected by radial velocity
Exoplanets with proper names